Moysés is a Portuguese name and surname. Notable people with the name include:

Given name:
 Moysés Baumstein (1931–1991), Brazilian artist
 Moysés Blás (born 1937), Brazilian former basketball player
 Moysés Cardoso (born 1900), Portuguese sports shooter
 Moyses Chahon (1918–1981), Brazilian Army general
 Moyses Ferreira Alves (1930–1980), Brazilian footballer
 Moysés Kuhlmann (1906–1972), Brazilian botanist
 Moysés Paciornik (1914–2008), Brazilian physician
 Moyses Szklo, Brazilian epidemiologist and physician scientist

Surname:
 Herch Moysés Nussenzveig (born 1933), Brazilian physicist, professor
 Ivone Moysés (1945–2018), Brazilian chess master
 Thiago Moyses (born 1981), Brazilian filmmaker and producer

See also
 Arthur Moyses William Hill, 2nd Baron Sandys, Anglo-Irish soldier and politician
 Bicyclus moyses
 Chris Moyses (born 1965), English football coach and former professional player
 Monochroa moyses
 Moyse
 Moyses Hill, English army officer
 Moyses van Wtenbrouck ( 1600–1646), Dutch Golden Age painter and etcher
 Štefan Moyses (1797–1869), Slovak bishop
 William Edward Moyses Reilly (1827–1886), British Major General

Portuguese-language surnames